Mittelland (German, ‘middle land’) may refer to:

 Mittelland, Switzerland, a district of the canton of Appenzell Ausserrhoden, Switzerland
 Swiss Plateau (German: Schweizer Mittelland), a major landscape in Switzerland
 Mittelland, part of Heligoland, a small archipelago in the North Sea
 Mittelland Canal, in central Germany

See also